The 2011 Heluva Good! Sour Cream Dips 400 was a NASCAR Sprint Cup Series stock car race that was held on June 19, 2011 at Michigan International Speedway in Brooklyn, Michigan. Contested over 200 laps, it was the fifteenth race of the 2011 Sprint Cup Series season. The race was won by Denny Hamlin for the Joe Gibbs Racing team. Matt Kenseth finished second, and Kyle Busch, who started 24th, clinched third.

There were five cautions and 22 lead changes among 12 different drivers throughout the course of the race.  The result moved Hamlin to the ninth position in the Drivers' Championship, 77 points behind points leader, Carl Edwards and one point ahead of Tony Stewart.  Chevrolet maintained its lead in the Manufacturers' Championship, 13 points ahead of Ford and 21 ahead of Toyota, with twenty-one races remaining in the season. A total of 88,000 people attended the race.

Results

References

Heluva Good! Sour Cream Dips 400
Heluva Good! Sour Cream Dips 400
NASCAR races at Michigan International Speedway
Heluva Good! Sour Cream Dips 400